Ladislas Lazaro (June 5, 1872 – March 30, 1927) was an American politician who served as a Democrat U.S. Representative from  from 1913 to 1927.

Biography
Born near Ville Platte, Evangeline (then part of St. Landry) Parish, Louisiana, Lazaro was the son of Marie Denise Ortego, a daughter of one of Ville Platte’s founding Hispanic families, and Alexandre Lazaro Biladinoviz, a Roma immigrant from the town of Risan (in what is now Montenegro), who came to America aboard a ship from Russia as a stowaway. Lazaro attended public and private schools and Holy Cross College, New Orleans, Louisiana.
He was graduated from Louisville (Kentucky) Medical College in 1894 and practiced his profession in Washington, Louisiana, until 1913.

He became interested in agricultural pursuits. He served as president of the parish school board for four years. He also served in the Louisiana State Senate from 1908 to 1912.

U.S. House of Representatives
Lazaro was elected as a Democrat to the Sixty-third and to the seven succeeding Congresses; he served from March 4, 1913, until his death in Washington, D.C. on March 30, 1927.  He became the second Hispanic American ever to chair a standing committee in the U.S. House of Representatives when he was named chairman of the Enrolled Bills Committee in 1915.

He died while in office in 1927 and was interred in the Old City Cemetery, Ville Platte, Louisiana.

See also
List of Hispanic and Latino Americans in the United States Congress
List of United States Congress members who died in office (1900–49)

References

External links

1872 births
1927 deaths
People from Ville Platte, Louisiana
Democratic Party Louisiana state senators
Democratic Party members of the United States House of Representatives from Louisiana
American people of Spanish descent
Hispanic and Latino American members of the United States Congress
People from Washington, Louisiana
American people of Montenegrin descent
American people of Romani descent